Elgiva solicita  is a species of fly in the family Sciomyzidae. It is found in the  Palearctic

References

External links
Images representing Elgiva solicita at BOLD

Sciomyzidae
Insects described in 1780
Muscomorph flies of Europe